Gordil is a town in the Vakaga Prefecture of the northern Central African Republic.

History
From 25-26 June 2006, a battle took place in Gordil between joint FACA- force and Chadian rebels of FUC and MPRD which caused casualties. This battle led to the death of 20 rebels, 11 FACA soldiers, and 2 Chadian soldiers.

On 11 March 2022, Wagner Group and FACA entered Gordil to conduct door-to-door operations and  killed 15 people. On 11 April 2022, Wagner Group and FACA visited Gordil. They killed 22 people and burned houses. On 23 May 2022, Wagner Group revisited Gordil and stayed for three days. During the three days of Wagner's presence, they looted shops.

Demography 
Goula makes up the majority of the town population.

Transport
The town is served by Gordil Airport.

References

External links
Satellite map at Maplandia

Populated places in Vakaga